Getoar Selimi (born 3 July 1982), also known as Geasy or Ghetto Geasy, is a Kosovo-Albanian rapper, singer and songwriter. Born and raised in Pristina, Selimi found prominence in the Albanian-speaking Balkans as a member of the musical group Tingulli 3nt beginning in 1996.

Life and career

1989–2011: Formations and Tingulli 3nt 

Getoar Selimi was born on 3 July 1982 in the city of Pristina, then part of the Socialist Federal Republic of Yugoslavia, present Kosovo. Selimi together with Kosovo-Albanian musicians Besa Gashi and Jeton Topusha formed the musical group Tingulli 3nt and began their career as a group in 1996. They rose to national prominence in the Albanian-speaking Balkans with the release of six successful studio albums, which altogether significantly contributed to the rise of their stardom. Selimi continues to be member of Tingulli 3nt and commenced to release occasional solo projects since 2012.

2012–present: Solo projects and continued success 

By 2012, Selimi went on to release his first single "N'Prishtinë" in November, which he dedicated to his hometown Pristina. His follow-up single, "E nxonme", was released approximately a year after in September 2013.

Personal life 

As of 2015, Selimi resides with his wife Albanian television presenter Marina Vjollca in a residence they bought in Tirana, Albania. After their engagement, he married Vjollca on 10 September 2017. On 24 November 2021, Vjollca gave birth to the couple's first daughter, Marget Selimi, in Tirana.

Discography

Singles

As lead artist

As lead artist

See also 
Getoar, an Albanian given name

References 

1982 births
21st-century Albanian rappers
21st-century Albanian male singers
Albanian songwriters
Albanian-language singers
Kosovo Albanians
Kosovan people of Albanian descent
Kosovan rappers
Kosovan singers
Living people
Musicians from Pristina